Ohlendorf is a German surname.  Notable people with the surname include:

Otto Ohlendorf (1907–1951), German SS general and Holocaust perpetrator, executed for war crimes
Ross Ohlendorf (born 1982), American baseball pitcher

German-language surnames